Patrick "Paddy Bawn" Brosnan (16 November 1917 – 23 July 1995) was an Irish Gaelic footballer whose league and championship career at senior level with the Kerry county team spanned fifteen years from 1937 to 1952.

References

1917 births
1995 deaths
Dingle Gaelic footballers
Drinking establishment owners
Fishers
Kerry inter-county Gaelic footballers
Munster inter-provincial Gaelic footballers